David G. Willey (born 4 November 1947), known as the Mad Scientist, is a former physics instructor at the University of Pittsburgh at Johnstown in Johnstown, Pennsylvania. Physics has been a major interest in his life since he attended The Coleshill School and the John Port School in Etwall, Derbyshire. He has been presenting physics shows since the early 1980s. Willey is a scientific consultant for the skeptics group, C.S.I. (Committee for Skeptical Inquiry). He also designs physics apparatus/equipment for the Science Kit Boreal Labs. In his spare time he enjoys hunting, woodworking, working with stained glass, and playing golf.

Education and career
Willey studied at Aston University and Birmingham University from 1966 to 1971.  Then he taught at Saltley Grammar School, in Birmingham from 1971 to 1972.  Next, Willey moved from his home country of England to the United States and enrolled at the Ohio State University. He was in Columbus, Ohio until he obtained his masters in physics in 1974.  His first teaching position was with the University of Pittsburgh at Johnstown.  In the early 1980s, he performed his first physics show at the University's open house.

A few months later, Willey made a 15-minute video of physics demonstrations with a group of troubled boys from a remand home.  This video was played on local television for the public to see.  A local school teacher saw Willey's demonstrations and asked him to perform some of them for her class.  Willey's physics show, "How Does A Thing Like That Work?" was born.  His wife Raven became his assistant.

Looking for the next big physics demonstrations, Willey found fire walking.  He teamed up with the Norwegian Physicist, Kjetil Kjernsmo of University of Oslo, to study the physics behind fire walking.  They developed a computer model of a foot while a person fire walked.  They needed data from long walks and hot walks to verify the computer model.  A fire walking group from Seattle, Washington volunteered to perform the first walk.  On 18 October 1997, in Redmond, Washington, Michael McDermott walked across a bed of coals that were at a temperature of 1813 °F.  Willey also walked on that fire bed, but not at the record temperature.

Willey's next, and most famous fire walk, was in July 1998 at the University of Pittsburgh at Johnstown.  This fire walk was 165 feet long to break the world record for the longest distance walking on fire. His walk was recorded and shown on television by the BBC and ABC.  This got the attention of the producers of The Tonight Show with Jay Leno.  Willey's nickname, "Mad Scientist", was born.  For the next 10 years (1998–2008) Willey performed physics demonstrations on The Tonight Show.  He appeared on the show 19 times.  During this time, Willey also appeared on other television shows such as Time Warp, Humanly Impossible, Talk Soup, Steve Harvey's Big Time, King 5 TV, Skeptical Inquirer, Extreme Body Parts, John Stossel's Power of Belief, the Crook and Chase Show, Science Park, Jensen!, Johannes B. Kerner, The Brian Conley Show, Fantasia, Penn & Teller: Bullshit!, Wednesday Night at the Lab, part of the 25th Wonders of Physics in Madison, Wisconsin, and a seven part series on the Shaolin Monks for the Canadian Discovery Channel.

References

External links
 David G. Willey YouTube channel

British sceptics
English physicists
British expatriate academics in the United States
Alumni of Aston University
Living people
1947 births
Alumni of the University of Birmingham
Ohio State University Graduate School alumni
People from Birmingham, West Midlands
University of Pittsburgh faculty